Grevillea centristigma is a species of flowering plant in the family Proteaceae and is endemic to the south-west of Western Australia. It is a low, compact to erect, rounded or spreading shrub with softly-hairy narrowly elliptic to egg-shaped leaves with the narrower end towards the base, and deep yellow to orange flowers with a yellow, later brick-red style.

Description

Taxonomy
This grevillea was first formally described in 1986 by Donald McGillivray who gave it the name Grevillea drummondii subsp. centristigma in his book New Names in Grevillea (Proteaceae). In 1992, Gregory John Keighery elevated the subspecies to species status as Grevillea centristigma. The specific epithet (centristigma) means "centre stigma".

Distribution and habitat
Grevillea centristigma grows in moist forest and is widespread between the Whicher Range, Collie and Walpole in the Jarrah Forest and Warren biogeographic regions of south-western Western Australia.

Conservation status
This species is listed by the Government of Western Australia Department of Biodiversity, Conservation and Attractions as "not threatened".

References

centristigma
Eudicots of Western Australia
Proteales of Australia
Taxa named by Donald McGillivray
Plants described in 1986